Lilia Ignatova (born 17 May 1965) is a Bulgarian modern rhythmic gymnast. She was one of the Golden Girls of Bulgaria who dominated rhythmic gymnastics in the 1980s.

Personal life
Ignatova was born on 17 May 1965 in Sofia, Bulgaria. She gave birth to her daughter in early 1995. Her twin sister Kamelia, was the pole player of the Bulgarian group exercise and became World Champion with the team in 1981.

Biography

Ignatova was born in Sofia on 17 May 1965 and was part of the "golden girl" generation which dominated the sport in the early eighties.  She won the all around silver at the 1980 European Championships, with an additional silver for the hoop, and gold with clubs and ribbon.  She repeated this feat at the 1981 World Rhythmic Gymnastics Championships, winning additional golds for rope and hoop and silver for clubs.

She won gold with the ribbon at the 1982 European Championships and Silver in the all around competition at the 1983 World Rhythmic Gymnastics Championships where she also won gold for clubs and balls and bronze for the hoop.

At the 1st World Cup Final in Belgrade in 1983, she won the All-around title. She won gold with hoop and silver with ball at the European Championships in Vienna in 1984 and came second at the 1985 World Rhythmic Gymnastics Championships to teammate Diliana Gueorguieva where she also won gold with ball and clubs and bronze with rope. In 1986, she won her second World Cup Final title held in Tokyo, Japan and completed six consecutive victories in the Julieta Shishmanova Cup.

In 1986 she became European All-around Champion in Florence, this time sharing the first place together with the newcoming Bulgarian star Bianka Panova, with her final European Championships she was crowned with the Gold for the all around competition, and golds for rope and clubs and the silver with ribbon.

Her routines combined a high degree of difficulty, such as a backward shoulder roll with a circling ribbon, with choreography set to a wide variety of modern and classical music. Ignatova was one of the most elegant and charming gymnasts of all times. She gradually transformed her performing style, starting from dynamic, playful routines and finishing with brilliant pieces of art as "Ave Maria", with the ball 1986, to the violin accompaniment of the famous Mintcho Mintchev.

After retiring she appeared in a film musical Akatamus, directed by Gueorgui Duylguerov and performed onstage for the Theater 13, an innovative drama, music and dance Company led by Bonio Lungov.  She later coached at the Levski club where she began her career.  In 1999 she was one of four rhythmic gymnasts inducted into the FIG Hall of Fame. In 1993 she returned to her "second home", the LEVSKI Spartak gymnastics hall in Gerena to coach beginners.

References

External links
 
NSA Bulgarian gymnasts

1965 births
Living people
Bulgarian rhythmic gymnasts
Gymnasts from Sofia
Medalists at the Rhythmic Gymnastics World Championships